In mathematics, the binary logarithm is the power to which the number  must be raised to obtain the value . That is, for any real number ,

The binary logarithm is the logarithm to the base  and is the inverse function of the power of two function.

Historically, the first application of binary logarithms was in music theory, by Leonhard Euler: the binary logarithm of a frequency ratio of two musical tones gives the number of octaves by which the tones differ. Binary logarithms can be used to calculate the length of the representation of a number in the binary numeral system, or the number of bits needed to encode a message in information theory. In computer science, they count the number of steps needed for binary search and related algorithms. Other areas
in which the binary logarithm is frequently used include combinatorics, bioinformatics, the design of sports tournaments, and photography.

Binary logarithms are included in the standard C mathematical functions and other mathematical software packages.
The integer part of a binary logarithm can be found using the find first set operation on an integer value, or by looking up the exponent of a floating point value.
The fractional part of the logarithm can be calculated efficiently.

History

The powers of two have been known since antiquity; for instance, they appear in Euclid's Elements, Props. IX.32 (on the factorization of powers of two) and IX.36 (half of the Euclid–Euler theorem, on the structure of even perfect numbers).
And the binary logarithm of a power of two is just its position in the ordered sequence of powers of two.
On this basis, Michael Stifel has been credited with publishing the first known table of binary logarithms in 1544. His book Arithmetica Integra contains several tables that show the integers with their corresponding powers of two. Reversing the rows of these tables allow them to be interpreted as tables of binary logarithms.

Earlier than Stifel, the 8th century Jain mathematician Virasena is credited with a precursor to the binary logarithm. Virasena's concept of ardhacheda has been defined as the number of times a given number can be divided evenly by two. This definition gives rise to a function that coincides with the binary logarithm on the powers of two, but it is different for other integers, giving the 2-adic order rather than the logarithm.

The modern form of a binary logarithm, applying to any number (not just powers of two) was considered explicitly by Leonhard Euler in 1739. Euler established the application of binary logarithms to music theory, long before their applications in information theory and computer science became known. As part of his work in this area, Euler published a table of binary logarithms of the integers from 1 to 8, to seven decimal digits of accuracy.

Definition and properties
The binary logarithm function may be defined as the inverse function to the power of two function, which is a strictly increasing function over the positive real numbers and therefore has a unique inverse.
Using the complex logarithm in this definition allows the binary logarithm to be extended to the complex numbers.

As with other logarithms, the binary logarithm obeys the following equations, which can be used to simplify formulas that combine binary logarithms with multiplication or exponentiation:

For more, see list of logarithmic identities.

Notation
However, several other notations for this function have been used or proposed, especially in application areas.

Donald Knuth credits this notation to a suggestion of Edward Reingold, but its use in both information theory and computer science dates to before Reingold was active.
The , ISO 31-11 and ISO 80000-2 standards recommend yet another notation, . According to these standards,  should not be used for the binary logarithm, as it is instead reserved for the common logarithm .

Applications

Information theory

In information theory, the definition of the amount of self-information and information entropy is often expressed with the binary logarithm, corresponding to making the bit the fundamental unit of information. With these units, the Shannon–Hartley theorem expresses the information capacity of a channel as the binary logarithm of its signal-to-noise ratio, plus one. However, the natural logarithm and the nat are also used in alternative notations for these definitions.

Combinatorics

Although the natural logarithm is more important than the binary logarithm in many areas of pure mathematics such as number theory and mathematical analysis, the binary logarithm has several applications in combinatorics:
Every binary tree with  leaves has height at least , with equality when  is a power of two and the tree is a complete binary tree. Relatedly, the Strahler number of a river system with  tributary streams is at most .
Every family of sets with  different sets has at least  elements in its union, with equality when the family is a power set.
Every partial cube with  vertices has isometric dimension at least , and has at most   edges, with equality when the partial cube is a hypercube graph.
The precise size that can be guaranteed is not known, but the best bounds known on its size involve binary logarithms.
This calculation forms the basis for a recommendation that 52-card decks should be shuffled seven times.

Computational complexity

The binary logarithm also frequently appears in the analysis of algorithms, not only because of the frequent use of binary number arithmetic in algorithms, but also because binary logarithms occur in the analysis of algorithms based on two-way branching. This idea is used in the analysis of several algorithms and data structures. For example, in binary search, the size of the problem to be solved is halved with each iteration, and therefore roughly  iterations are needed to obtain a solution for a problem of size . Similarly, a perfectly balanced binary search tree containing  elements has height .

The running time of an algorithm is usually expressed in big O notation, which is used to simplify expressions by omitting their constant factors and lower-order terms. Because logarithms in different bases differ from each other only by a constant factor, algorithms that run in  time can also be said to run in, say,  time. However, for logarithms that appear in the exponent of a time bound, the base of the logarithm cannot be omitted.

Algorithms with running time  are sometimes called linearithmic.

Average time quicksort and other comparison sort algorithms
Searching in balanced binary search trees
Exponentiation by squaring
Longest increasing subsequence
Binary logarithms also occur in the exponents of the time bounds for some divide and conquer algorithms, such as the Karatsuba algorithm for multiplying -bit numbers in time ,
and the Strassen algorithm for multiplying  matrices in time
. The occurrence of binary logarithms in these running times can be explained by reference to the master theorem for divide-and-conquer recurrences.

Bioinformatics

In bioinformatics, microarrays are used to measure how strongly different genes are expressed in a sample of biological material. Different rates of expression of a gene are often compared by using the binary logarithm of the ratio of expression rates: the log ratio of two expression rates is defined as the binary logarithm of the ratio of the two rates.

Data points obtained in this way are often visualized as a scatterplot in which one or both of the coordinate axes are binary logarithms of intensity ratios, or in visualizations such as the MA plot and RA plot that rotate and scale these log ratio scatterplots.

Music theory
In music theory, the interval or perceptual difference between two tones is determined by the ratio of their frequencies. Intervals coming from rational number ratios with small numerators and denominators are perceived as particularly euphonious. The number of octaves by which two tones differ is the binary logarithm of their frequency ratio.

To study tuning systems and other aspects of music theory that require finer distinctions between tones, it is helpful to have a measure of the size of an interval that is finer than an octave and is additive (as logarithms are) rather than multiplicative (as frequency ratios are). Such a measure is given by the cent, which divides the octave into  equal intervals ( semitones of  cents each).

Sports scheduling
In competitive games and sports involving two players or teams in each game or match, the binary logarithm indicates the number of rounds necessary in a single-elimination tournament required to determine a winner. For example, a tournament of  players requires  rounds to determine the winner, a tournament of  teams requires  rounds, etc. In this case, for  players/teams where  is not a power of 2,  is rounded up since it is necessary to have at least one round in which not all remaining competitors play. The same number of rounds is also necessary to determine a clear winner in a Swiss-system tournament.

Photography
In photography, exposure values are measured in terms of the binary logarithm of the amount of light reaching the film or sensor, in accordance with the Weber–Fechner law describing a logarithmic response of the human visual system to light. A single stop of exposure is one unit on a base- logarithmic scale. More precisely, the exposure value of a photograph is defined as

Binary logarithms (expressed as stops) are also used in densitometry, to express the dynamic range of light-sensitive materials or digital sensors.

Calculation

Conversion from other bases
An easy way to calculate  on calculators that do not have a  function is to use the natural logarithm or the common logarithm ( or ) functions, which are found on most scientific calculators.

or approximately

Integer rounding
The binary logarithm can be made into a function from integers and to integers by rounding it up or down.  These two forms of integer binary logarithm are related by this formula:

The definition can be extended by defining .

The integer binary logarithm can be interpreted as the zero-based index of the most significant  bit in the input. In this sense it is the complement of the find first set operation, which finds the index of the least significant  bit. Many hardware platforms include support for finding the number of leading zeros, or equivalent operations, which can be used to quickly find the binary logarithm. The fls and flsl functions in the Linux kernel and in some versions of the libc software library also compute the binary logarithm (rounded up to an integer, plus one).

Iterative approximation

For a general positive real number, the binary logarithm may be computed in two parts.
First, one computes the integer part,  (called the characteristic of the logarithm).
This reduces the problem to one where the argument of the logarithm is in a restricted range, the interval , simplifying the second step of computing the fractional part (the mantissa of the logarithm).
For any , there exists a unique integer  such that , or equivalently . In other words:

For normalized floating-point numbers, the integer part is given by the floating-point exponent, and for integers it can be determined by performing a count leading zeros operation.

The algorithm for computing the fractional part can be described in pseudocode as follows:
 Start with a real number  in the half-open interval .  If , then the algorithm is done, and the fractional part is zero.
 Otherwise, square  repeatedly until the result  lies in the interval . Let  be the number of squarings needed.
 Taking the logarithm of both sides and doing some algebra: 
 Once again  is a real number in the interval . Return to step 1 and compute the binary logarithm of  using the same method.

In the special case where the fractional part in step 1 is found to be zero, this is a finite sequence terminating at some point. Otherwise, it is an infinite series that converges according to the ratio test, since each term is strictly less than the previous one (since every ). For practical use, this infinite series must be truncated to reach an approximate result.

Software library support
The log2 function is included in the standard C mathematical functions. The default version of this function takes double precision arguments but variants of it allow the argument to be single-precision or to be a long double. In computing environments supporting complex numbers and implicit type conversion such as MATLAB the argument to the log2 function is allowed to be a negative number, returning a complex one.

References

External links

Feynman and the Connection Machine

Binary arithmetic
Calculus
Logarithms